Sir Abraham Hume, 1st Baronet (1703 – 10 October 1772) was a British businessman and MP.

He was the fourth son of Robert Home (subsequently Hume) of Ayton, Berwick.

Hume was a Principal Managing Owner for groups which built ships and hired them to the East India Company. He was elected Member of Parliament for Steyning in 1747–54, and Tregony in 1761–68, both rotten boroughs.

After inheriting the Wormleybury estate from his brother Alexander in 1765 he rebuilt the house his brother had commissioned in 1734. He was given a baronet on 4 April 1769.

He was the father of 2 sons and a daughter by his wife Hannah, sixth daughter of Sir Thomas Frederick and was succeeded by his eldest son Sir Abraham Hume, 2nd Baronet. Their daughter Hannah married the wit James Hare.

References

1703 births
1772 deaths
People from Berwick-upon-Tweed
Members of the Parliament of Great Britain for English constituencies
British MPs 1747–1754
British MPs 1761–1768
Members of the Parliament of Great Britain for constituencies in Cornwall
Baronets in the Baronetage of Great Britain